The Swedish women's national under-18 ice hockey team is the national women's junior ice hockey team of Sweden. The team represents Sweden at the International Ice Hockey Federation's Ice Hockey U18 Women's World Championship and other international ice hockey tournaments and events.

U18 Women's World Championship record
The Swedish women's national under 18 ice hockey team is one of five teams to have participated in every IIHF U18 Women's World Championship Top Division tournament since the event was inaugurated in 2008. They have won seven IIHF U18 Women's World Championship medals, two silver (2018, 2023) and five bronze (2009, 2010, 2012, 2013, 2016).

Team

Current roster
Preliminary roster for the 2023 IIHF U18 Women's World Championship.

Head coach: Andreas KarlssonAssistant coaches: Pernilla Winberg, Ulf Hall, Johan Ryman

World Championship player awards 
Best Defenseman
 2022: Tuva Kandell
 2023: Mira Jungåker

Best Goaltender
 2013: Minatsu Murase
 2016: Emma Söderberg
 2018: Anna Amholt
 2023: Felicia Frank

All-Star Team
 2013: Ebba Strandberg (D)
 2016: Emma Söderberg (G), Jessica Adolfsson (D)
 2018: Anna Amholt (G), Maja Nylén Persson (D)
 2023: Felicia Frank (G), Mira Jungåker (D)

Top-3 Players on Team
 2008: Tina Enström (F), Klara Myrén (F), Cecilia Östberg (F)
 2009: Isabella Jordansson (F), Emma Nordin (F), Cecilia Östberg (F)
 2010: Anna Borgfeldt (F), Josefine Holmgren (D), Lisa Hedengren (F) 
 2011: Lina Bäcklin (D), Sofia Carlström (G), Olivia Nyström (F)
 2012: Matildah Andersson (F), Linnea Hedin (D), Michelle Löwenhielm (F)
 2013: Linnea Hedin (D), Elin Johansson (F), Julia Lennartsson (F)
 2014: Sarah Berglind (G), Denise Husak Asp (F), Hanna Sköld (F)
 2015: Jessica Adolfsson (D), Hanna Olsson (F), Emma Söderberg (G)
 2016: Maja Nylén Persson (D), Emma Söderberg (G), Moa Wernblom (F)
 2017: Matilda af Bjur (F), Hanna Olsson (F), Sofia Reideborn (G)
 2018: Anna Amholt (G), Maja Nylén Persson (D), Sofie Lundin (F)
 2019: Emma Forsgren (D), Thea Johansson (F), Hanna Thuvik (F)
 2020: Ida Boman (G), Thea Johansson (F), Annie Silén (D)
 2022: Nicole Hall (F), Lisa Jönsson (G), Mira Markström (F)
 2023: Felicia Frank (G), Mira Jungåker (D), Hilda Svensson (F)

References

Notes

 

I
Women's national under-18 ice hockey teams